The 1971 NAIA World Series was the 15th annual tournament hosted by the National Association of Intercollegiate Athletics to determine the national champion of baseball among its member colleges and universities in the United States and Canada.

The tournament was played at Phoenix Municipal Stadium in Phoenix, Arizona.

Linfield (28-11) defeated David Lipscomb (44-15) in the first game of the championship series, 9–8, to win the Wildcats' second NAIA World Series (the first team to win a second) and first since 1966.

Linfield catcher Rob Webb was named tournament MVP.

Bracket

See also
 1971 NCAA University Division baseball tournament
 1971 NCAA College Division baseball tournament

Reference

NAIA World Series
NAIA World Series
NAIA World Series